Tecayehuatzin (Aquiauhtzin) (1430-1500) was a Nahuatl noble poet born in Ayapango, Mexico. Although a sought-out composer of poetry, few of his poems survive.

Poems attributed to Aquiauhtzin include:

Chalcacihuacuicatl (Song of Chalcan Women)
Noconcacon Cuicatl (I Have Heard A Song)

References

Nahuatl-language poets
1430 births
1500 deaths